The Cuba men's national volleyball team represents Cuba in international volleyball competitions and friendly matches, governed by Federación Cubana De Voleibol. Cuba in the 1976 Summer Olympics won their first bronze medal. In FIVB competitions, the national team won one gold each at World Cup, World Grand Champions Cup, World League and Challenger Cup. Cuba also attained two silver and two bronze World Championship medals and have won the NORCECA Championship 15 times with a 6-peat record.

Results

Olympic Games
1972 – 10th place
1976 –  Bronze medal
1980 – 7th place
1992 – 4th place
1996 – 6th place
2000 – 7th place
2016 – 11th place

World Championship
1956 – 19th place
1966 – 17th place
1970 – 13th place
1974 – 8th place
1978 –  Bronze medal
1982 – 10th place
1986 – 5th place
1990 –  Silver medal
1994 – 4th place
1998 –  Bronze medal
2002 – 19th place
2006 – 15th place
2010 –  Silver medal
2014 – 11th place
2018 – 18th place
2022 – 14th place

World Cup
1969 – 9th place
1977 –  Bronze medal
1981 –  Silver medal
1989 –  Gold medal
1991 –  Silver medal
1995 – 6th place
1999 –  Silver medal
2011 – 5th place

World Grand Champions Cup
1993 –  Bronze medal
1997 –  Bronze medal
2001 –  Gold medal
2009 –  Silver medal

World League
1991 –  Silver medal
1992 –  Silver medal
1993 – 4th place
1994 –  Silver medal
1995 –  Bronze medal
1996 – 4th place
1997 –  Silver medal
1998 –  Gold medal
1999 –  Silver medal
2000 – 8th place
2001 – 5th place
2002 – 13th place
2003 – 13th place
2004 – 7th place
2005 –  Bronze medal
2006 – 7th place
2007 – 7th place
2008 – 10th place
2009 – 4th place
2010 – 4th place
2011 – 8th place
2012 –  Bronze medal
2013 – 13th place
2014 – 21st place
2015 – 18th place
2016 – 22nd place
2017 – Withdrew

Nations League
2023 – Qualified

Challenger Cup
2018 – 4th place
2019 –  Silver medal
2022 –  Gold medal
2023 – Participated in Nations League

Pan American Games
1959 – 7th place
1967 –  Bronze medal
1971 –  Gold medal
1975 –  Gold medal
1979 –  Gold medal
1983 –  Silver medal
1987 –  Silver medal
1991 –  Gold medal
1995 –  Bronze medal
1999 –  Gold medal
2003 –  Silver medal
2007 –  Bronze medal
2011 –  Silver medal
2015 – 5th place
2019 –  Silver medal

NORCECA Championship
1969 –  Gold medal
1971 –  Gold medal
1973 –  Silver medal
1975 –  Gold medal
1977 –  Gold medal
1979 –  Gold medal
1981 –  Gold medal
1983 –  Bronze medal
1985 –  Silver medal
1987 –  Gold medal
1989 –  Gold medal
1991 –  Gold medal
1993 –  Gold medal
1995 –  Gold medal
1997 –  Gold medal
1999 –  Silver medal
2001 –  Gold medal
2003 –  Bronze medal
2005 –  Silver medal
2007 –  Bronze medal
2009 –  Gold medal
2011 –  Gold medal
2013 –  Bronze medal
2015 –  Silver medal
2017 – did not participate
2019 –  Gold medal
2021 – 4th Place

Pan-American Cup
2006 – 5th place
2007 –  Bronze medal
2014 –  Gold medal
2016 –  Gold medal
2017 –  Bronze medal
2018 –  Bronze medal
2019 –  Gold medal
2021 – Withdrew
2022 –  Gold medal

America's Cup
1998 –  Bronze medal
1999 – 4th place
2000 –  Gold medal
2001 –  Silver medal
2005 –  Bronze medal
2007 –  Bronze medal
2008 –  Gold medal

Central American and Caribbean Games
1930 –  Silver medal
1935 –  Bronze medal
1938 –  Bronze medal
1946 –  Gold medal
1950 –  Silver medal
1954 –  Bronze medal
1962 – 4th place
1966 –  Gold medal
1970 –  Gold medal
1974 –  Gold medal
1978 –  Gold medal
1982 –  Gold medal
1986 –  Gold medal
1990 –  Gold medal
1993 –  Gold medal
1998 –  Gold medal
2002 – Did not participate
2006 –  Silver medal
2010 – Did not participate
2014 –  Bronze medal
2018 – 4th place

Goodwill Games
1986 – did not participate
1990 –  Bronze medal

Team

Current squad
The following is the Cuban roster in the 2022 FIVB Volleyball Men's World Championship.

Head coach:  Nicolas Vives

Dream Team Squad
After 2001, many players defected from Cuba seeking better life conditions. Some of them excelled during their pro career, being more often considered the best of their positions. The following list follow 15 men throughout that period of time, that one way or another make history and were called Dream team squad.

Head coach: Gilberto Herrera

2016 Finland rape incident
Eight members of the Cuban national men's volleyball team, including the team's captain, were held in Tampere, Finland on suspicion of aggravated gang rape of a 35-year-old Finnish woman, as of July 2016. Two of them were discarded of the claims later. The incident took place in the Hotel Ilves at Tampere where the Olympics-bound Cuban team were staying. The arrested players were scheduled to play in the Cuban team at the 2016 Summer Olympics in Rio de Janeiro.

On 16 August, the six team members still remaining in custody were charged with aggravated rape at Pirkanmaa District Court and the proceedings started on 29 August. On 20 September, four of the men, Osmany Santiago Uriarte Mestre, Rolando Cepeda Abreu, Ricardo Norberto Calvo Manzano and Abraham Alfonso Gavilán were given five-year jail sentences while Luis Tomás Sosa Sierra is facing a prison term of three and a half years. All men appealed, and on 30 June 2017 the Turku court of appeal decreased the length of all sentences and lifted the sentence of Sosa Sierra.

According to the New York Times, the Cuban Volleyball Association stated early on that the athletes’ behavior was counter to the “discipline the sense of honor and respect that govern our sport and society.”

In June 2017, all players convicted for aggravated rape appealed, and sentences were reduced in the case of Osmany Uriarte, Abraham Alfonso, Ricardo Calvo and the ex-captain Rolando Cepeda Abreu. Sosa was released as he was found not guilty due to lack of evidence, and he received a compensation from the government of Finland for the quantity of 200,000 euros, due to damages against his person and in his sports career.

Kit providers
The table below shows the history of kit providers for the Cuba national volleyball team.

Sponsorship
Primary sponsors include: main sponsors like Honda.

References

External links
FIVB profile

Volleyball
National men's volleyball teams
Volleyball in Cuba
Men's sport in Cuba